The 1892 Georgia Bulldogs football team represented the Georgia Bulldogs of the University of Georgia during the 1892 college football season and was its first football team ever fielded. The team completed its inaugural season with a 1–1 record.  The Bulldogs played their first inter-collegiate football game in history against  and won by a final score of 50–0. Georgia's second and final game of 1892 was against Auburn, which marked the beginning of a rivalry that would later become known as the Deep South's Oldest Rivalry.  This was the Georgia Bulldogs' one and only season under the guidance of head coach Charles Herty, the so-called father of football at Georgia.

Schedule

See also
 List of the first college football game in each US state

Sources

References

Georgia
Georgia Bulldogs football seasons
Georgia Bulldogs football